Sadio Doumbia and Fabien Reboul were the defending champions but chose not to defend their title.

Antonio Šančić and Nino Serdarušić won the title after defeating Ivan and Matej Sabanov 6–3, 6–3 in the final.

Seeds

Draw

References

External links
 Main draw

Banja Luka Challenger - Doubles
2021 Doubles